Foad Nasser Babu (born May 31) is a Bangladeshi music composer. He is the founder, band leader, music composer, Lyricist, singer and the keyboardist of Feedback, a Bangladeshi band. He also plays piano, bass guitar and rhythm both in session music recordings and in the live shows. Melay Jaire is one of his best composition, written & melody composed by Maqsoodul Haque.

He composes music for radio and television commercials, theme and background score for drama, feature films, documentaries and songs for solo artists.

In Bangladesh, TV commercials (Jingle) has got a modern feel and thereafter propelled to the ultra-modern genre with his decades-long effort.

As a bass guitarist he has been performing with Runa Laila for the last four decades.

Career
In 1972, Babu composed his first song "Abar Eshechhe Shey Muktir Logno" - a Gono Sangeet (inspirational songs for the masses) written by Ahmed Bashir, performed by Shomonbo i Shilpi Goshthi.  "Udashi Ey Mone" was his first recorded song.

Babu owns the recording studio Art of Noise in Dhaka.

Discography

Band

 উল্লাস (Cheers) (1987)
 মেলা (Carnival) (1990)
 বংগাব্দ ১৪০০ (Bengali Year 1400) (1994)
 বাউলিয়ানা (Bauliana) (1996)
 দেহঘড়ি (Body clock) (1997)
 ০২ (02)

Mixed
 Rongomela Vol.1
 Together
 Kiron
 Adda
 6 Band Mixed '99
 Aloron
 Millennium

References

External links
 

Living people
Bangladeshi composers
Year of birth missing (living people)
Place of birth missing (living people)